This is a list of episodes for the television series Private Benjamin.

Series overview

Episodes

Season 1 (1981)

Season 2 (1981–82)

Season 3 (1982–83)

References

External links
 

Private Benjamin